Rhizobium indigoferae is a Gram negative root nodule bacteria, which nodulates and forms nitrogen-fixing symbioses with Indigofera species. Its type strain is CCBAU 71714(T) (= AS 1.3046(T)).

References

Further reading
Pongslip, Neelawan. Phenotypic and Genotypic Diversity of Rhizobia. Bentham Science Publishers, 2012. 
Goyal, Aakash, and Priti Maheshwari, eds. Frontiers on Recent Developments in Plant Science. Vol. 1. Bentham Science Publishers, 2012. 
Velázquez, E., and Claudino Rodriguez-Barrueco, eds. First international meeting on microbial phosphate solubilization. Vol. 102. Springer, 2007.

External links

LPSN
Type strain of Rhizobium indigoferae at BacDive -  the Bacterial Diversity Metadatabase

Rhizobiaceae
Bacteria described in 2002